The Wisden Leading Cricketer in the World is an annual cricket award selected by Wisden Cricketers' Almanack. It was established in 2004, to select the best cricketer based upon their performances anywhere in the world in the previous calendar year. A notional list of previous winners, spanning from 1900 to 2002, was published in the 2007 edition of Wisden.

Since 1889, Wisden has published a list of Cricketers of the Year, typically selecting five cricketers that had the greatest impact during the previous English cricket season. However, in the 2000 edition, the editor Matthew Engel recognised that the best players in the world were typically no longer playing English domestic cricket, and opted to select the Cricketers of the Year based on their performances anywhere in the world. This criterion was applied for the following three years, but in 2004 it reverted to being based on the English season, and a Leading Cricketer in the World was also selected. The recipient of the award is selected by the editor of Wisden, with advice from cricket experts. An Australian, Ricky Ponting was chosen as the first winner of the award, for scoring 1,503 runs in international cricket, including eleven centuries during 2003.

In the 2007 edition of Wisden, a list of winners for previous years was published. A sixteen-person panel helped to select the winners, which Engel described as the cricketer that "would have been the first name down in the World XI to play Mars". It was decided that the first year that would be listed was 1900, as prior to that Engel claimed international cricket was too "inchoate and haphazard to make comparison sensible". No awards were made for the periods of the World Wars, leaving a list of 93 winners. During this selection, Don Bradman was listed the most, winning on ten occasions, while Garfield Sobers was the leading cricketer eight times. Engel noted that despite attempts to the contrary, the award maintains cricket's bias towards batsmen.

List of award winners

Actual winners

Note that each year's Leading Cricketer of the World is announced in the following year's Wisden, so the 2003 winner was announced in 2004, and so on.

Notional winners

Multiple winners

Unlike Wisdens Cricketers of the Year, players can be recognised more than once as the Leading Cricketer in the World, and eighteen players have been selected for multiple years. The majority of these have won the award twice, but six players have been recognised for three or more years: Don Bradman, Garfield Sobers, Jack Hobbs, Viv Richards, Shane Warne and Virat Kohli. In the 2007 edition which published the notional historical winners, Engel noted with "surprise and pleasure" that the first five players were the same as had been selected as Wisdens five Cricketers of the Century.

Sachin Tendulkar and Warne have both been selected as notional and actual winners, while Virender Sehwag was the first player to be recognised twice by Wisden as an actual winner since 2004. Kumar Sangakkara has since similarly been selected twice, and in 2012 he became the first player to be recognised twice in one edition of Wisden, as both Leading Cricketer in the World and a Cricketer of the Year.

Winners by country

Cricketers from eight of the twelve Test playing nations have been recognised for the award by Wisden, with Bangladesh, Zimbabwe, Ireland and Afghanistan not represented. Players from Australia and England dominate the list, having won more than half of the time, although this is disproportionately the case in the notional list. Prior to World War II, 34 of the 36 winners played for Australia or England. The "actual" award winners are more evenly distributed; Indian players have won six times, English players have won four times, Australian and Sri Lankan players have won three times, whilst players from South Africa have received the award twice since 2004.

See also
 Six Giants of the Wisden Century
 Wisden Australia's Cricketer of the Year
 Wisden Cricketers of the Century
 ICC Awards

References

Cricket awards and rankings
 
Wisden